Álvaro Sandoval (born 5 November 1990) is a Mexican modern pentathlete. He competed in the men's event at the 2020 Summer Olympics.

References

External links
 

1990 births
Living people
Mexican male modern pentathletes
Modern pentathletes at the 2020 Summer Olympics
Olympic modern pentathletes of Mexico
Place of birth missing (living people)
Modern pentathletes at the 2015 Pan American Games